Keki is a Hindic given name that may refer to
Keki Abdi Pasha (died April 1789), Ottoman statesman
Keki Adhikari, Nepalese actress and model
Keki Byramjee Grant (1920–2011), Indian cardiologist
Keki N. Daruwalla (born 1937), Indian poet and short story writer
Keki Hormusji Gharda (born 1929), Indian chemical engineer and entrepreneur
Keki Khambatta (1910–?), Indian cricketer
Keki Mistry, Indian chief executive
Keki Tarapore (1910–1986), Indian cricketer 
Keki Tarapore (coach) (1922–2001), Indian cricketer and coach

See also
KeKi, a Finnish ice hockey club

Indian given names